Iradj Raminfar (born 1949 in Tehran) is a Persian art director, production designer and costume designer. He graduated in art directing from FDA and studied architecture in France. He began working in cinema with Stranger and Fog (1975). As one of the most prominent art directors, he has published a book (Film Design) based on his experiences.

Awards
Raminfar received the prize for Killing Mad Dogs (2001), Persian Prince(M. Noorizad) 2005, When We Are All Asleep(B. Bayzai) 2009, The Crime(M. Kimiai) 2011, from Fajr International Film Festival.

Selected filmography
 The Crow, 1977
 Ballad of Tara, 1978
 Death of Yazdgerd, 1981
 The Inner Devil, 1983
 Bashu
 The Little Stranger, 1986 (screened in 1989)
 Maybe Some Other Time, 1987
 Canary Yellow
 The Lead, 1988
 Fifth of June Flight
 Reyhaneh, 1989
 The Quiet Home, 1990
 Travellers, 1991
 The Day of Devil, 1994
 Prostration on Water, 1996
 The Circle, 1999
 The Hidden Half, 2001
 The insane flew away, 2003
 Crimson Gold, 2004
 Mercy, 2005
 Offside, 2006
 A few days later, 2007
 When We Are All Asleep, 2008
 The Crime, 2010
 Give Back(STERDAD), 2011
 Do Not Be Tired!, 2012
 What is The Time in Your World, 2013
 Risk of Acid Rain, 2014

References

People from Tehran
Living people
1950 births
Iranian art directors
University of Paris alumni
Iranian production designers